Tvrdonice is a municipality and village in Břeclav District in the South Moravian Region of the Czech Republic. It has about 2,100 inhabitants.

Notable people
Jan Netopilík (1936–2022), athlete

References

Villages in Břeclav District
Moravian Slovakia